Olivier Blondel (born 9 July 1979) is a French former professional football player who played as a goalkeeper.

External links
 

1979 births
Living people
Association football goalkeepers
French footballers
Ligue 1 players
Ligue 2 players
Le Havre AC players
People from Mont-Saint-Aignan
Toulouse FC players
ES Troyes AC players
FC Istres players
Sportspeople from Seine-Maritime
Footballers from Normandy